Ini-Abasi Anefiok Umotong (born 15 May 1994) is a Nigerian professional footballer who plays as a forward for FA Women's Championship club Lewes and the Nigeria national team.

Early life
Born in Calabar, Nigeria, Umotong alongside her family moved to Birmingham, England when she was one year old. She is the youngest of six siblings born to Dr Ben Anefiok and Grace Umotong of Ikono in Old Cross River State. She began playing football at the age of five and it was in Primary school where she was spotted by Birmingham City in 2003. She later went to King Edward VI Five Ways School.

International career
She earned her first call up to the Super Falcons in February, 2015 when coach Edwin Okon invited 36 players to camp to prepare for the 11th All-Africa Games qualifiers, 2016 Olympic Games qualifiers and the 7th FIFA Women’s World Cup finals. The Economics and Actuarial Science undergraduate at the University of Southampton had to skip the first two weeks of the camp in Abuja due to her studies.

On arrival after two weeks, promising Umotong got her first taste of action almost immediately as a late substitute in a warm-up 1–1 draw against a male academy team, showing true dedication in her quest to make the team for Canada 2015. She followed it up with a goal when she came on for 20 minutes in another tune-up match against Nigeria Women Premier League side, Confluence Queens, before becoming the first Portsmouth player to feature in a full international after making her 33-minute debut for Nigeria in the first leg of their All-Africa Games qualifier against Mali in Bamako. She was eventually named in the 23-player list for the World Cup in Canada but did not feature in any of Nigeria's three group matches as the African Champions failed to progress to the knockout stage.

In January 2019 at the Four Nations Tournament in China, Umotong scored her first goal for the Super Falcons. She emerged from the substitute's bench to register the final goal in a 4–1 win over Romania. "One of the stand-out moments of my career," she said.

Club career
Umotong's phenomenal first season (2014–15) at Portsmouth has opened the path for her international career, after her goal scoring exploits led the FA Women's Premier League Southern Division side to win their seventh successive Hampshire County Cup and the league title, while narrowly missing out on promotion to the FA Women's Super League 2. With 29 goals in 25 league and cup matches, Umotong emerged top goal scorer for Pompey.

In February 2016, Umotong left Portsmouth for FA WSL 2 club Oxford United. Oxford manager Les Taylor was pleased with the signing: "Ini is a striker who possesses both power and pace." She had scored 25 goals for Portsmouth during the first part of 2015–16. With Oxford Umotong continued to score regularly, finishing FA WSL 2 top-goalscorer with 13 goals in 19 appearances, before adding four goals in seven appearances in the FA WSL Spring Series.

After a transfer to Brighton & Hove Albion in July 2017, Umotong scored eight league goals to help the Seagulls finish second in the re-branded second tier (now known as the FA Women's Championship). When Brighton successfully bid for a franchise in the top division, Umotong was one of the club's existing players to be kept on. She hailed the influence of Brighton coach Hope Powell, crediting the former England manager with a dramatic improvement in her game.

Personal life
Before becoming a full-time footballer with Brighton, Umotong combined her football career with her studies for an Economics degree at the University of Southampton. She graduated with first-class honours and claimed to have been inspired by Eniola Aluko.

Honours

Club
Portsmouth
 FA Women's Premier League Southern Division (1): 2015
 Hampshire County Cup (1): 2015

References

External links

 
 Profile at Portsmouth FC
 

1994 births
Living people
Nigeria women's international footballers
Nigerian women's footballers
Wright State Raiders women's soccer players
Nigerian emigrants to the United Kingdom
People from Calabar
FA Women's National League players
Women's Super League players
2015 FIFA Women's World Cup players
Women's association football forwards
Brighton & Hove Albion W.F.C. players
Oxford United W.F.C. players
Portsmouth F.C. Women players
Alumni of the University of Southampton
Nigerian expatriate women's footballers
Nigerian expatriate sportspeople in the United States
Expatriate women's soccer players in the United States
Lewes F.C. Women players
Women's Championship (England) players
Växjö DFF players
Expatriate women's footballers in Sweden
Damallsvenskan players
Nigerian expatriate sportspeople in Sweden